Lars Roslyng Christiansen  (born April 18, 1972 in Sønderborg) is a former Danish team handball player. He is European Champion, winning the 2008 European Men's Handball Championship and 2012 European Men's Handball Championship with the Danish national handball team. He was top scorer at the 2008 championship together with Nikola Karabatic  and Ivano Balić, and was also voted into the 2008 All-star team.

Christiansen has played 338 games for the Danish national team, and scored 1503 goals. He is currently the player with most games and most goals for the Danish national team.

He played for the German club SG Flensburg-Handewitt, and was part of the team when the club won the German championship in 2004, and won the EHF Cup in 1997. In his 14 years with SG Flensburg-Handewitt he scored 3996 times, 1623 of these was scored from the 7 meter penalty spot.

Lars Christiansen's cousin Jan Paulsen has played together with Lars Christiansen for the Danish national handball team - as playmaker.

He has been married to former handballer, Christina Roslyng, who played at the Danish national handball team. Together, they have two sons, Frederik and August. They split up in 2009, however, as of 2012, they are back together.

In 2018, he participated in the Danish version of Dancing with the Stars, Vild med dans, with the partner Sofie Kruuse.

Trophies

Club Team 
EHF Champions League:
: 2004, 2007
German Championship: 
: 2004
DHB-Pokal:
: 2003, 2004, 2005
EHF Cup:
: 1997
EHF Cup Winner's Cup:
: 2001
EHF City Cup:
: 1999
Danish Championship:
: 1993, 1994
German Bundesliga Topscorer: 2005,2003

National Team
IHF World Championship:
: 2011
: 2007
EHF European Championship: 
: 2008, 2012
: 2002, 2004, 2006

Individual awards
 All-Star Left wing of the European Championship: 2008
 Top Scorer of the European Championship: 2008
 Top Scorer of the Handball-Bundesliga: 2003, 2005

See also
List of handballers with 1000 or more international goals

References

1972 births
Living people
SG Flensburg-Handewitt players
People from Sønderborg Municipality
Danish male handball players
Olympic handball players of Denmark
Handball players at the 2008 Summer Olympics
KIF Kolding players
Sportspeople from the Region of Southern Denmark